Shabolovka may refer to one of the following:
Shabolovka Street in Moscow
Shabolovka tower, a radio tower in Moscow
Shabolovskaya, a station in Moscow Metro